Wilfrid Lawson  (born Wilfrid Lawson Worsnop; 14 January 1900 – 10 October 1966) was an English character actor of screen and stage.

Life and career
Lawson was born Wilfrid Lawson Worsnop in Bradford, West Riding of Yorkshire. He was educated at Hanson Boys' Grammar School, Bradford, and entered the theatre in his late teens, appearing on both the British and American stage throughout his career.

He made his film début in East Lynne on the Western Front (1931) and appeared in supporting roles until he took the lead in The Terror (1938). In arguably his most celebrated film role, he played dustman-turned-lecturer Alfred P. Doolittle in the film version of George Bernard Shaw's Pygmalion (1938), alongside Leslie Howard and Wendy Hiller.

He also had memorable leading roles in Pastor Hall (1940), as a German village clergyman who denounces the new Nazi regime in 1934; Tower of Terror (1941) as the wild-eyed maniacal lighthouse keeper Wolfe Kristen; and the title role in The Great Mr. Handel (1942), a biopic of the 18th century composer, all three showing his broad range. He also made a number of films in America beginning with Ladies in Love (1936) and including John Ford's The Long Voyage Home (1940) alongside John Wayne. His last leading role was in The Turners of Prospect Road (1947).

As a result of bouts of alcoholism, Lawson became difficult to work with, and throughout the 1950s his roles became increasingly small—even uncredited in some cases. Despite this he still gave memorable performances such as Prince Andrei Bolkonsky's father in King Vidor's War and Peace (1956), Ed in Hell Drivers (1957) and Uncle Nat in Room at the Top (1958), filmed in Lawson's home town of Bradford.

The 1960s saw something of a career resurgence, beginning with his turn as Black George in Tony Richardson's Tom Jones (1963) and culminating in two of his most notable latter day performances: the decrepit butler Peacock in The Wrong Box and the Dormouse in Jonathan Miller's television adaptation of Alice in Wonderland (both 1966). That same year saw his death, in London, from a heart attack.

His brother was the supporting player Gerald Lawson (born Bernard Worsnop, 30 April 1897 – 6 December 1973) and a nephew was actor Bernard Fox (born Bernard Lawson, 10 May 1927 – 14 December 2016).

Was the only actor Peter O’Toole really admired

Selected stage performances

 Evensong (1932)
 Peer Gynt
 Richard III
 The Father (Strindberg play)
 The Lower Depths (1962)

Filmography

 East Lynne on the Western Front (1931) - Dick Webb / Carlyle
 Strike It Rich (1933) - Raikes
 Turn of the Tide (1935) - Luke Fosdyck
 Ladies in Love (1936) - Ben Horvath
 White Hunter (1936) - Michael Varek
 The Man Who Made Diamonds (1937) - Gallanie
 Bank Holiday (1938) - Police Sergt.
 The Terror (1938) - Mr. Goodman
 Yellow Sands (1938) - Richard Varwell
 Pygmalion (1938) - Alfred Doolittle
 The Gaunt Stranger (1938) - Maurice Meister
 Stolen Life (1939) - Thomas E. Lawrence
 Allegheny Uprising (1939) - "Mac" MacDougall
 Dead Man's Shoes (1940) - Lucien Sarrou
 Pastor Hall (1940) - Pastor Frederick Hall
 The Long Voyage Home (1940) - Captain
 It Happened to One Man (1940) - Felton Quair
 The Farmer's Wife (1941) - Churdles Ash
 The Ghost Train (1941) - Minor Role (uncredited)
 The Man at the Gate (1941) - Henry Foley
 Danny Boy (1941) - Jack Newton
 Jeannie (1941) - James McLean
 Tower of Terror (1941) - Wolfe Kristan
 Hard Steel (1942) - Walter Haddon
 The Night Has Eyes (1942) - Jim Sturrock
 The Great Mr. Handel (1942) - George Frideric Handel
 Thursday's Child (1943) - Frank Wilson
 Fanny by Gaslight (1944) - Chunks
 The Turners of Prospect Road (1947) - Will Turner
 The Prisoner (1955) - The Jailer
 Make Me an Offer (1955) - Charlie's Father
 An Alligator Named Daisy (1955) - Irishman (uncredited)
 Now and Forever (1956) - Gossage
 War and Peace (1956) - Prince Bolkonsky
 Doctor at Large (1957) - Dustman. with Cyst (uncredited)
 Miracle in Soho (1957) - Mr. Morgan (uncredited)
 Hell Drivers (1957) - Ed
 The Naked Truth (1957) - Walter - Contestant in T.V. Show (uncredited)
 Tread Softly Stranger (1958) - Holroyd (uncredited)
 Room at the Top (1959) - Uncle Nat (uncredited)
 Expresso Bongo (1959) - Mr. Rudge (uncredited)
 The Naked Edge (1961) - Mr. Pom
 Nothing Barred (1961) - Albert
 Over the Odds (1961) - Willie Summers
 Postman's Knock (1962) - Postman
 Go to Blazes (1962) - Scrap Dealer
 Becket (1962) - Old Soldier (uncredited)
 Tom Jones (1963) - Black George
 The Wrong Box (1966) - Peacock, the Butler
 The Viking Queen (1967) - King Priam (final film role)

Television and radio

 Tales from Dickens (1956) - Barrel Binacre
 BBC Sunday-Night Theatre (1953–1958) - Luka, a pilgrim / Stephen Flesser / Cornelius Rockley / Michel / Henslowe / Flambeau
 The Stone Faces by J. B. Priestley with Luise Rainer (broadcast 1957)
 Tales of the Vikings ("Pedigree", 1959) - Old Saxon
 ITV Play of the Week (1960) - Old man
 Armchair Theatre (1958–1961) - Satan
 Hancock (ATV, 1963) - Paper Man
 Espionage ("The Frantick Rebel", 1964) Lunatic - King George III (uncredited)
 Cluff (1964) - Bateson
 Z Cars (1965) - Towser
 Theatre 625 (1965) - Mr. Bourne
 Danger Man/Secret Agent ("Not So Jolly Roger", 1966) - Corrigan
 The Hunchback of Notre Dame (1966) - King of the Beggars
 The Likely Lads (1966) - Grandad
 Alice in Wonderland (1966, TV Movie) - Dormouse
 Three Sisters (Chekhov) BBC Home Service Radio 1965. Directed by John Tydeman. Cast included Paul Scofield, Ian McKellen, Lynn Redgrave and Jill Bennett.

References

External links
 Stage performances by Wilfred Lawson listed in the Theatre Archive, University of Bristol
 

1900 births
1966 deaths
20th-century English male actors
Artists' Rifles soldiers
English male film actors
English male stage actors
English male television actors
Male actors from Bradford